Praia dos Flamengos (also: Praia de Flamengo) is a beach in the southwest of the island of São Vicente in Cape Verde. It is 2.5 km southeast of the village São Pedro and 11 km southwest of Mindelo. It is accessible from the northeast by a dirt road.

References

External links

Flamengos on mindelo.info 

Geography of São Vicente, Cape Verde
Beaches of Cape Verde